Wendy Sue Kopp (born June 29, 1967) is the CEO and co-founder of Teach For All, a global network of independent nonprofit organizations working to expand educational opportunity in their own countries and the Founder of Teach For America (TFA), a national teaching corps.

Background
Wendy Kopp attended Highland Park High School in Dallas, Texas and later was an undergraduate in the School of Public and International Affairs at Princeton University. She received her Arts Baccalaureate degree from Princeton in 1989 and was a member of Princeton's Business Today and the University Press Club.

Teach For America
In 1989, Kopp proposed the creation of Teach For America in her 177-page long senior thesis titled "An Argument and Plan for the Creation of the Teachers Corps" which she completed under the supervision of Marvin Bressler. She was convinced that many in her generation were searching for a way to assume a significant responsibility that would make a real difference in the world and that top college students would choose teaching over more lucrative opportunities if a prominent teacher corps existed.

Shortly after graduating from Princeton, Kopp founded Teach For America. In 1990, 500 recent college graduates joined Teach For America's charter corps.

In 2007, Kopp founded Teach For All, a global network of independent nonprofit organizations that apply the same model as Teach For America in other countries.

In 2013, Kopp transitioned out of the role of CEO of Teach For America and named Elisa Villanueva Beard and Matt Kramer as co-CEOs of the organization. Villanueva Beard assumed full leadership in September 2015. Today, Kopp remains an active member of Teach For America's board.

Kopp chronicled her experiences at Teach For America in two books, One Day, All Children: The Unlikely Triumph of Teach For America and What I Learned Along the Way and A Chance To Make History: What Works and What Doesn't in Providing an Excellent Education For All.

According to 2012 online records, Kopp makes at least $416,876 per year.

Personal life
Wendy Kopp is married to Richard Barth, president of the KIPP Foundation. They have four children and live in Manhattan.

Awards
Honorary doctorates
 2014: University of Oklahoma
 2013: Boston University
 2012: Harvard University
 2010: Marquette University
 2009: Washington University in St. Louis
 2008: Georgetown University
 2007: Mount Holyoke College
 2007: Rhodes College
 2004: Pace University
 2004: Mercy College
 2001: Smith College
 2000: Princeton University
 1995: Connecticut College
 1995: Drew University

Awards
 2011: Spelman College National Community Service Award
 2008: The Skoll Award for Social Entrepreneurship
 2008: Presidential Citizens Medal
 2008: Ashoka Fellowship
 2006: Golden Plate Award of the American Academy of Achievement
 2006: The Harold W. McGraw, Jr. Prize in Education Award
 2004: The John F. Kennedy New Frontier Award
 2003: The Clinton Center Award for Leadership and National Service
 2003: The Schwab Foundation's Outstanding Social Entrepreneur Award
 1994: Aetna's Voice of Conscience Award
 1994: The Citizen Activist Award from the Gleitsman Foundation
 1993: Princeton University Woodrow Wilson Award
 1991: The Jefferson Award for Public Service
 1991: Echoing Green Fellowship

Trivia
On February 5, 2007, Kopp appeared on The Colbert Report.

Published works
 One Day, All Children: The Unlikely Triumph of Teach For America and What I Learned Along the Way (2001)
 A Chance to Make History: What Works and What Doesn't in Providing an Excellent Education for All (2011)

References

External links

Biographies:
 Official biography – Teach For America
 Thesis sparks thriving teacher corps – Princeton University
 Biography – John Glenn School of Public Affairs
 
 Wendy Kopp: America's Best Leaders
Interviews and speeches:
 Feature video interview with Wendy Kopp on The Alcove with Mark Molaro
 Teaching Children – PBS
 Change the World Interviews
 2013 Commencement Speech – Boston University
 2009 Commencement Speech – Washington University in St. Louis
 2008 Commencement Speech – Georgetown University
 2007 Commencement Speech – Mount Holyoke College
 2006 Commencement Speech – University of North Carolina, Chapel Hill
 Podcast Interview with Wendy Kopp Social Innovation Conversations, February 1, 2008
 How I Built This - Teach For America: Wendy Kopp
 
 "Wendy Kopp Biography and Interview" – American Academy of Achievement

1967 births
American nonprofit executives
Educators from Texas
American women educators
Living people
People from Austin, Texas
Presidential Citizens Medal recipients
Women nonprofit executives
Princeton School of Public and International Affairs alumni
21st-century American women
Princeton University alumni